The Osella FA1L was a Formula One car designed by Antonio Tomaini and raced by Osella in the 1988 FIA Formula One World Championship. The car was the last Osella to be powered by a turbocharged engine, the 1.5-litre V8 named the Osella 890T.

Car and engine
Osella had been using Alfa turbo power since , but had scored only two points with the engine over five seasons when Piercarlo Ghinzani had finished fifth in the 1984 Dallas Grand Prix. The team's cars and the engine had both proved unreliable and as a result Fiat, the parent company of Alfa Romeo, withdrew its support for the engine, though they allowed Osella to keep using it in 1988 so long as the Alfa name was not used. This resulted in the engine being renamed the Osella 890T (or Osella V8) for the season.

The 1988 season can be seen as a dismal failure for the small Italian team owned by Enzo Osella, though Larini reported that early season testing at Monza had produced good straight-line speed and encouraging lap times. The car was heavy and produced excessive drag which hurt its top speed while not producing enough downforce which made it slow when cornering (like all Osella's since , the FA1L had its origins in the Alfa Romeo 183T used by the factory Alfa team in 1983). Also, the V8 turbo engine suffered from both high fuel consumption and a lack of throttle response (turbo lag). Indeed the FA1L (nicknamed "FAIL") was often hard pressed to qualify or race as fast as the 'atmo' V8 cars. While top speeds were generally the same as the slower atmo cars, the non-turbo V8's did not suffer from turbo lag and thus had better acceleration.

Season summary
After using 1987's FA1I for the opening round in Brazil, the FA1L first appeared in Round 2 at the San Marino Grand Prix, but failed to pass scrutineering after it was found the team had modified the chassis, changing the fuel zone shape and then with the drivers feet illegally in front of the front axle line (Solution admitted only for cars that maintain the same chassis of 1987, as i.e. Zakspeed 871). New FIA safety regulations for  meant that all cars had to have the drivers feet behind the front axle line, though teams could implement it into their 1988 cars. The car was disqualified on the basis that the changed mounting points plus the driver's feet position constituted a new chassis which had not been passed in FIA crash testing. The car was passed legal for its second race, the next round in Monaco where it would have its most successful outing. There Larini qualified 25th (second last, though out-qualifying the Lotus-Honda of Satoru Nakajima who failed to qualify), and managed to stay out of trouble to finish ninth, three laps down on race winner Alain Prost in his McLaren-Honda.

From there the rot set in for the team. The car's shortcomings were exposed at the next race in Mexico where Larini failed to qualify despite the thinner air in the high altitude of Mexico City giving the turbo powered cars an extra 20–25% horsepower advantage over their atmospheric rivals than was normal (meaning that the Osella V8 could still use most of its power while the best atmo engine, the Ford DFR used by Benetton, was only producing around 560–590 bhp). The FA1L was the only turbo car not to qualify in Mexico, blown off by even the equally struggling Zakspeed 881 turbos.

Larini only finished three races in 1988. Other than his ninth in Monaco, he was classified 19th and last at Silverstone after running out of fuel on lap 60 of the 65 lap race (highlighting the 890T's high fuel consumption), and 12th in Portugal. After scoring no points in the first half of the season to the British Grand Prix, Osella was forced into pre-qualifying. Larini failed to pre-qualify the car in both Hungary and at the final round in Australia. Rather surprisingly, the car's best qualifying performance was at the tight and twisty Jerez circuit for the Spanish Grand Prix where Larini surprisingly ended up 14th on the grid, only 2.945 seconds slower than the pole winning McLaren of Ayrton Senna.

On average, Larini and the FA1L qualified some 5.8 seconds slower than the pole winning times set during the season.

The FA1L was replaced by the FA1M for the  season. As turbo power was banned by the FIA from 1989, the FA1M was powered by the naturally aspirated Ford DFR V8 engine. Although the team scored no points with the FA1M, the car did prove more competitive in the hands of the highly rated Larini and his veteran team mate Piercarlo Ghinzani.

Complete Formula One results
(key)

References

Books
 

Formula One cars